Bernard Harold Conlen (born 26 October 1960) is a former Australian rules footballer who played with South Melbourne in the Victorian Football League (VFL), and  in the South Australian National Football League (SANFL).

Career

South Melbourne
Conlen, an Oakleigh District recruit, played for South Melbourne in the final two rounds of the 1981 VFL season. He debuted in South Melbourne's 111 point loss to Essendon at Windy Hill in round 21, having 18 disposals. The next week the club played their last ever game before relocation, against North Melbourne. Conlen had five disposals, in a 33 point loss.

He took part in the 1982 Escort Championships, which was won by the Swans, but didn't feature in the 1982 VFL season, only the reserves.

West Adelaide
In 1983 he was enticed to South Australia where he joined West Adelaide and was a rover in their premiership team that year. He also finished with the third most votes in the 1983 Magarey Medal count, behind Stephen Kernahan (ineligible) and winner Tony Antrobus.

References

1960 births
Australian rules footballers from Victoria (Australia)
Sydney Swans players
West Adelaide Football Club players
Living people